The 1992 San Francisco Bay Blackhawks season was the club's third in the American Professional Soccer League and their fourth season overall. The Blackhawks finished 
in third place, and were defeated, 2–1, by the Tampa Bay Rowdies in the playoff semifinals. They also made 
a strong run in the CONCACAF Champions Cup, defeating three opponents and reaching the Fifth round, where they fell to Mexico's Club América by an aggregate 
4-3 score.

Squad
The 1992 squad

Competitions

APSL

Standings

Match results

Season

Playoffs 

* = ShootoutSource:

CONCACAF Champions Cup

Professional Cup 

Source:

References

External links
The Year in American Soccer – 1992 | APSL
San Francisco Bay Blackhawks All-time Game Results | Soccerstats.us

1992 in sports in California
San Francisco Bay Blackhawks
American soccer clubs 1992 season